Marcel Riesz (16 November 1886 – 4 September 1969) was a Hungarian mathematician, known for work on summation methods, potential theory, and other parts of analysis, as well as number theory, partial differential equations, and Clifford algebras. He spent most of his career in Lund (Sweden).

Marcel is the younger brother of Frigyes Riesz, who was also an important mathematician and at times they worked together (see F. and M. Riesz theorem).

Biography

Marcel Riesz was born in Győr, Austria-Hungary; he was the younger brother of the mathematician Frigyes Riesz. He obtained his PhD at Eötvös Loránd University under the supervision of Lipót Fejér. In 1911, he moved to Sweden upon the invitation of Gösta Mittag-Leffler. From 1911 to 1925 he taught at Stockholms högskola (now Stockholm University). From 1926 to 1952 he was professor at Lund University. After retiring, he spent 10 years at universities in the United States. He returned to Lund in 1962, and died there in 1969.

Riesz was elected a member of the Royal Swedish Academy of Sciences in 1936.

Mathematical work

Classical analysis

The work of Riesz as a student of Fejér in Budapest was devoted to trigonometric series:

One of his results states that, if

and if the Fejer means of the series tend to zero, then all the coefficients an and bn are zero.

His results on summability of trigonometric series include a generalisation of Fejér's theorem to Cesàro means of arbitrary order. He also studied the summability of power and Dirichlet series, and coauthored a book  on the latter with G.H. Hardy.

In 1916, he introduced the Riesz interpolation formula for trigonometric polynomials, which allowed him to give a new proof of Bernstein's inequality.

Together with his brother Frigyes Riesz, he proved the F. and M. Riesz theorem, which implies, in particular, that if μ is a complex measure on the unit circle such that

then the variation |μ| of μ and the Lebesgue measure on the circle are mutually absolutely continuous.

Functional-analytic methods

Part of the analytic work of Riesz in the 1920s used methods of functional analysis.

In the early 1920s, he worked on the moment problem, to which he introduced the operator-theoretic approach by proving the Riesz extension theorem (which predated the closely related Hahn–Banach theorem).

Later, he devised an interpolation theorem to show that the Hilbert transform is a bounded operator in Lp  The generalisation of the interpolation theorem by his student Olaf Thorin is now known as the Riesz–Thorin theorem.

Riesz also established, independently of Andrey Kolmogorov, what is now called the Kolmogorov–Riesz compactness criterion in Lp: a subset K ⊂Lp(Rn) is precompact if and only if the following three conditions hold: (a) K is bounded;

(b) for every  there exists  so that

for every 

(c) for every  there exists  so that

for every  with |y| < ρ, and every .

Potential theory, PDE, and Clifford algebras

After 1930, the interests of Riesz shifted to potential theory and partial differential equations. He made use of "generalised potentials", generalisations of the  Riemann–Liouville integral. In particular, Riesz discovered the Riesz potential, a generalisation of the Riemann–Liouville integral to dimension higher than one.

In the 1940s and 1950s, Riesz worked on Clifford algebras. His 1958 lecture notes, the complete version of which was only published in 1993, were dubbed by the physicist David Hestenes "the midwife of the rebirth" of Clifford algebras.

Students
Riesz's doctoral students in Stockholm include Harald Cramér and Einar Carl Hille. In Lund, Riesz supervised the theses of Otto Frostman, Lars Hörmander, and Olof Thorin.

Publications

References

External links 
 
 

1886 births
1969 deaths
20th-century Hungarian mathematicians
20th-century Hungarian people
20th-century Swedish people
Swedish mathematicians
Mathematical analysts
Functional analysts
Measure theorists
People connected to Lund University
People from Lund
Members of the Royal Swedish Academy of Sciences
Emigrants from the Austro-Hungarian Empire to Sweden
People from Győr
Swedish Jews
Austro-Hungarian mathematicians